Inna Vladimirovna Abramova (born 23 October 1966) is a Soviet swimmer. She competed in two events at the 1988 Summer Olympics. She placed 14th in the Women's 50 meters Freestyle with and 5th in the Women's 100 meters Freestyle Relay.

References

External links
 

1966 births
Living people
Soviet female freestyle swimmers
Olympic swimmers of the Soviet Union
Swimmers at the 1988 Summer Olympics
Sportspeople from Gomel